Women's kabaddi at the 2010 Asian Games was held in Nansha Gymnasium, Guangzhou, China from 22 to 26 November 2010.

Eight teams entered the competition but The Nepalese women's team was unable to participate due to a dispute between the National Sports Council and the Nepal Olympic Committee regarding players' participation.

Squads

Results
All times are China Standard Time (UTC+08:00)

Preliminary round

Group A

Group B

Knockout round

Semifinals

Final

Final standing

References

Results

External links
Official website

Women